The Berdyshevka  is a river in Russia, flows in Arkhangelsk Oblast. It is 17 km long, and its mouth is 102 km on the right bank of the Vychegda.

References

External links
 ScienceGraph.net

Rivers of Arkhangelsk Oblast